705 Erminia is a minor planet orbiting the Sun. Its name derives from the comic opera Erminie. An occultation on 8 December 2014 gave 3 chords, with one measurement suggesting a small moon 6-10 kilometers wide at a distance of 400 kilometers to the primary.

See also 
 List of Solar System objects by size

References

External links 
 Lightcurve plot of (705) Erminia, Antelope Hills Observatory
 Asteroids with Satellites, Robert Johnston, johnstonsarchive.net
 Discovery Circumstances: Numbered Minor Planets (1)-(5000) – Minor Planet Center
 
 

Background asteroids
Erminia
Erminia
Binary asteroids
X-type asteroids (Tholen)
C-type asteroids (SMASS)
19101006